Michelle Raghdee Nouri, (born October 17, 1973) is an Italian journalist and author, most known for her first memoir, "The girl from Baghdad", which highlights her childhood in Baghdad, fleeing Iraq and her arrival in Italy. With her new memoir, "Il cammino delle foglie di tè" ("The path of tea leaves"), Nouri concludes from where she began in her first novel and covers her integration in the West.

Biography
Born in Prague to an Iraqi Muslim father from Baghdad and a Catholic Czech mother, six months after the birth of Nouri, along with her parents they lived in Baghdad until she reached sixteen. Soon after the Gulf War erupted, Nouri's father divorced her mother, whom decided to travel back to Prague along with Nouri and her sisters in 1988 after the fall of communism, Nouri then leaves at the age of eighteen to settle in Italy.

Her publications involve the intercultural dialogue between both Islam and Christianity, the two religions she grew up with; in addition to the differing cultures she has been exposed to. Nouri currently works with various newspapers, and has revealed her story in two autobiographies, The girl from Baghdad, 2007 and The path of tea leaves, 2010.   

She was also known for having "flirted" with the late Uday Hussein, former Iraqi president Saddam Hussein's eldest son.

Publications
 "La ragazza di Baghdad" ("The girl in Baghdad"), 2007
 "Il cammino delle foglie di tè", 2010

References

External links
 Michelle Nouri biography in Italian via telegiornaliste.com
 Michelle Nouri video interview for Televisionet via youtube.com

1973 births
Living people
Italian people of Iraqi descent
Czech people of Iraqi descent
Italian people of Czech descent
Italian women writers
Italian writers
Italian journalists
Iraqi women writers
Iraqi writers